Zuliani is an Italian surname. Notable people with the surname include:

Manuel Zuliani (born 2000), Italian rugby union footballer
Mauro Zuliani (born 1959), Italian sprinter
Mirco Zuliani (born 1953), Italian Air Force officer 

Italian-language surnames